Arinze Stanley Egbengwu (born 1993) is a Nigerian artist, activist, photographer, engineer, and entrepreneur. He is best known for creating hyperrealistic pencil drawings.

Working primarily with charcoal and graphite on paper, Egbengwu uses his works as a medium for social and political activism. His work addresses matters including racism, modern slavery, and feminism both in his community and worldwide.

Early life 
Egbengwu was born on 20 November 1993. He is a self-taught artist and lives in Lagos, Nigeria.

In 2014, Arinze graduated from Imo State University with a Bachelor's of Engineering in agricultural engineering.

References 

http://www.thisiscolossal.com/2017/03/arinze-stanley-hyperrealistic-portraits/

1993 births
Nigerian artists
Hyperrealist artists
Living people